Blush ( - "Barash") is a 2015 Israeli drama film about teenage lesbian girls. It was written and directed by Michal Vinik, starring Sivan Noam Shimon, Jade Sakori and Dvir Benedek. The original title was Barash.

Plot
Naama (Sivan Noam Shimon) lives with her family in a typical suburb. Naama is used to partying with her friends and having casual sex with boys. Her parents aren't aware of her way of life, being concentrated on her soldier sister.

One day Naama meets a new student in school, and immediately feels attracted to her. They become friends and lovers and the new student, Dana (Jade Sakori) introduces Naama to Tel Aviv parties and drug scenes. Naama gets lost in Dana's love and world.

Awards and nominations

References

Further reading

External links
  Barash (Blush) at Lama Films
 
  Barash (Blush) at Israeli Film Database
  Barash (Blush) at Lumiere

2015 films
2010s teen drama films
2015 LGBT-related films
2010s Hebrew-language films
Israeli drama films
Israeli LGBT-related films
Israeli teen drama films
Lesbian-related films
2015 drama films